Cassadee Blake Pope (born August 28, 1989) is an American pop and country singer. She was the lead vocalist and songwriter of the pop rock band Hey Monday, with whom she released one studio album and two EPs. Pope embarked on a solo career in early 2012 and released the EP Cassadee Pope in May 2012. She took part in the third season of The Voice and became the first female winner in December 2012. Her debut solo country album, Frame by Frame, was released in 2013 to a top 10 Billboard 200 charting. It debuted at No. 1 on Top Country Albums, with 43,000 copies sold in its first week.

Life and career

2008–2011: Career beginnings and Hey Monday

While attending Wellington High School in Wellington, Florida, Pope formed the band Blake with good friend Mike Gentile. The project disbanded before being signed and in 2008, she and Gentile along with Alex Lipshaw, Michael "Jersey" Moriarty, and Elliot James founded the pop punk band Hey Monday. Hey Monday released their first studio album, Hold on Tight, in October 2008. Pope wrote two songs and co-wrote the other nine songs. She appeared in Fall Out Boy's video for "America's Suitehearts", from their 2008 album Folie à Deux. She also provided guest vocals for The Cab's remix version of their song "Take My Hand" that appeared on Fall Out Boy's mixtape, Welcome to the New Administration, and appeared in the music video for it the following summer of 2009. James left the band at the end of 2009. Hey Monday's first EP Beneath It All was to be released in August 2010; to promote the album the group toured the US and played on the 2010 Warped Tour. The Christmas EP was released on December 6, 2011, and later that month Hey Monday took an indefinite hiatus on good terms.

2012–2014: Solo career, The Voice and Frame by Frame

In January and February 2012, Pope embarked on her first solo acoustic tour across the east and west coasts of the United States. She released her debut self-titled EP (self-labeled) on May 22, 2012, containing four songs written by Pope. She auditioned for season 3 of the singing competition The Voice during the summer and had all four coaches offer her a place on their teams; she ultimately picked country singer Blake Shelton. In the third live round, Pope performed "Over You", co-written by mentor Shelton. The song reached number one on the iTunes chart, knocking Psy's "Gangnam Style" down to number two. She was the only female contestant to advance to the Top 4 round where she performed "Stupid Boy" by country singer-songwriter Sarah Buxton, which also reached number one on iTunes. She advanced to The Voice finals, winning the title on the live finale results day in December. An album compiling her performances on The Voice entitled The Voice: The Complete Season 3 Collection reached No. 1 on the Heatseekers and sold 11,000 copies, and 8,000 more copies in the following week. Her self-titled EP also re-entered the chart at No. 42, selling 1,000 copies.

The Voice (2012)
 – Studio version of performance reached the top 10 on iTunes

In January 2013, Pope signed with country music label Republic Nashville; the lead single of her solo album, "Wasting All These Tears", was released on May 31, 2013. It debuted at number 37 on the Billboard Hot 100 and number 7 on the Billboard Hot Country Songs chart. It sold 125,000 copies in first week of release. The album, Frame by Frame, was released in October 2013. Pope spent most of 2014 touring with country artists Tim McGraw and Dierks Bentley. She also was featured on the Nashville Outlaws: A Tribute to Mötley Crüe album where she covered The Animal In Me.

2015–present: Summer EP and Stages 

Pope released the lead single, "I Am Invincible" from her upcoming second studio album. During late 2015, Pope recorded a duet with Chris Young, titled "Think of You" for his 2015 album I'm Comin' Over. This single became Pope's first song to peak at number one on the US Country Airplay chart in May 2016. In March 2017, Pope traveled to London and performed several times as part of the C2C: Country to Country festival lineup, including an appearance on the main stage with Young.

Pope's new EP, Summer, was released on June 3, 2016, and the title track was released as a single on June 6, 2016.

On July 24, 2016, Pope sang the Star Spangled Banner, the United States national anthem, before the Brickyard 400 NASCAR race at the Indianapolis Motor Speedway.

On October 16, 2016, Pope sang the Star Spangled Banner, the United States national anthem, before the Houston Texans and Colts game.

Pope and Young were nominated for Best Country Duo/Group Performance for "Think of You", making her first contestant from The Voice to receive a Grammy nomination.

In May 2017, Pope parted ways with BMLG records

On March 30, 2018, she independently released her first single in nearly 2 years, called "Take You Home". It was followed on August 10 by her second single of 2018, called "One More Red Light".

On February 1, 2019, Pope released her second full-length studio album, Stages.

On October 15th, 2021, Pope released her third full-length studio album, Thrive.

Personal life
In January 2010, Pope began dating drummer Rian Dawson, who is a member of the band All Time Low. They became engaged in February 2017. In July 2017, it was announced that the couple had ended their relationship.

Pope has been in a relationship with British actor and musician Sam Palladio since December 2017.

Influences 
When it comes to Pope's influences she has said "I'm all over the place. I tend to go backwards a little bit and listen to Natalie Imbruglia's Left of the Middle and old Shania, Michelle Branch, Avril, Blink 182…I'm kind of all over the board. And then more recently I'm into the new Blake Shelton album, not gonna lie. Hunter Hayes and Taylor Swift." Pope also mentions Martina McBride as one of her influences.

Filmography

Television

Discography

Studio albums

Extended plays

Singles

Promotional singles

Music videos

Releases from The Voice

Compilation albums

Singles

Guest appearances

Other appearances

Awards and nominations

Tours
Headlining
Solo Acoustic Tour (2012) with Stephen Jerzak, Justin Young, and Darling Parade
 CMT Next Women of Country Tour (2019) with Clare Dunn and Hannah Ellis

Supporting
Live & Loud Tour (2013) with Rascal Flatts & The Band Perry
Crop Circles and Tractor Beams Tour (2014) with Dean Brody
Sundown Heaven Town Tour (2014) with Tim McGraw & Kip Moore
Riser Tour (2014) with Dierks Bentley & Randy Houser
Southern Style Tour (2015) with Darius Rucker & David Nail
I'm Comin' Over World Tour (2016) with Chris Young
GIRL: The World Tour (2019) with Maren Morris

Notes

References

External links

 
 

1989 births
Living people
American acoustic guitarists
American women singer-songwriters
American pop guitarists
American women rock singers
American pop rock singers
American rock guitarists
American rock songwriters
American country rock singers
American country singer-songwriters
American women country singers
People from West Palm Beach, Florida
The Voice (franchise) winners
People from Wellington, Florida
Singer-songwriters from Florida
Country musicians from Florida
21st-century American women guitarists
21st-century American guitarists
Guitarists from Florida
21st-century American women singers
Universal Music Group artists
Big Machine Records artists
Decaydance Records artists
21st-century American singers